The Order of Defence Merit is an award of the Brazilian Military, established on 10 June 2002 by decree No. 4263.  The order is presented in five grades and recognizes distinguished service and exceptional contributions to Brazil by members of the Brazilian Military and the armies of friendly nations as well as civilians, and, less common, to organizations and institutions.

Grades
The five grades are Grand Cross, Grand Officer, Commander, Officer, and Knight.

Notable recipient
Édouard Guillaud, France (Officer)
Elon Musk, American Inventor

References

Orders, decorations, and medals of Brazil
2002 establishments in Brazil
Awards established in 2002